Speakeasy Ales & Lagers is a craft brewery that was founded in 1997 by Steve Bruce and Forest Gray in the Hunters Point neighborhood of San Francisco, California, USA. The company brands its beers with references to 1930s prohibition-era mobsters and organized crime. Prohibition Ale (an amber ale), the first beer the company produced, and Big Daddy IPA (an India Pale Ale), are two of the brewery's most popular beers. Speakeasy beer is primarily available in California, but has been distributed to over thirteen U.S. states and internationally. Speakeasy opened a tap room at the brewery in 2013, which is located at 1195 Evans Ave in San Francisco, CA, USA.

On March 10, 2017, Speakeasy announced that it had ceased operations for an indefinite period after struggling financially following a 2015 expansion for which they borrowed money from Union Bank. As a result, the company was placed into court ordered receivership and the brewery owner, Forest Gray, was forced out. Two months later Speakeasy Ales & Lagers was sold to Hunters Point Brewery, a holding company owned by Ces Butner, who is a former beer distributor based in Oakland, CA.

Products
Speakeasy Ales & Lagers has produced a large variety of unique beers and are organized into distinct series.

The Usual Suspects
 Prohibition Ale - Gold Medal Winner at the 2013 Great American Beer Festival in the amber/red category
 Big Daddy IPA
 Double Daddy Imperial IPA
 Payback Porter
 Metropolis Lager
 Scarlett Red Rye Ale
 Tallulah Extra Pale Ale
 Payback Coffee Porter
 Blood Orange Double Daddy Imperial IPA

Session Series
 Baby Daddy Session IPA
 Pop Gun Pilsner
 Suds Session Ale

The Limited Series
 Black Hand Chocolate Milk Stout
 Vendetta India Pale Ale
 Untouchable Pale Ale
 Betrayal Imperial Red Ale

Infamous Series
 Blind Tiger Imperial IPA
 Old Godfather Barleywine
 Barrel-aged Old Godfather Barleywine
 Scarface Imperial Stout
 Barrel-aged Scarface Imperial Stout
 Fixed Fight Barrel-aged Old Ale

Syndicate Series: a unique blend of vintage strong ales aged in bourbon barrels no less than twelve months. 
 Syndicate Series No. 01
 Syndicate Series No. 02
 Syndicate Series No. 03
 Syndicate Series No. 04

Official Website
GoodBeer.com

See also
 California breweries
 Barrel-aged beer

References

Food and drink companies based in San Francisco
Beer brewing companies based in the San Francisco Bay Area
Manufacturing companies based in San Francisco
1997 establishments in California
American companies established in 1997